There have been five baronetcies created for persons with the surname Morgan, two in the Baronetage of England, one in the Baronetage of Great Britain and two in the Baronetage of the United Kingdom. All five creations are extinct.

The Morgan Baronetcy, of Llantarnam in the County of Monmouth, was created in the Baronetage of England on 12 May 1642 for Edward Morgan. The third Baronet sat as Member of Parliament for Monmouthshire. The title became extinct on the death of the fourth Baronet in 1728.

The Morgan Baronetcy, of Llangattock (apparently either Llangattock Lingoed or Llangattock-Vibon-Avel) in the County of Monmouth, was created in the Baronetage of England on 7 February 1661 for Thomas Morgan. The second Baronet sat as Member of Parliament for Radnor and Herefordshire. The third Baronet was Member of Parliament for Herefordshire. The fourth Baronet sat as Member of Parliament for Hereford and Herefordshire. The title became extinct on the latter's death in 1767.

The Gould, later Morgan Baronetcy, of Tredegar in the County of Monmouth, was created in the Baronetage of Great Britain on 15 November 1792. For more information on this creation, see Baron Tredegar.

The Morgan Baronetcy, of Green Street, Grosvenor Square, in the Parish of Saint George, Mayfair, City of Westminster, in the County of London and of Lincoln's Inn, was created in the Baronetage of the United Kingdom on 13 October 1892 for the Welsh lawyer and Liberal politician George Osborne Morgan. He was childless and the title became extinct on his death in 1897.

The Morgan Baronetcy, of Whitehall Court in the City of Westminster, was created in the Baronetage of the United Kingdom 28 July 1906 for Walter Morgan, Lord Mayor of London from 1905 to 1906. The title became extinct on his death in 1916. Octavius Vaughan Morgan was the younger brother of Sir Walter Morgan, 1st Baronet.

Morgan baronets, of Llantarnam (1642)
Sir Edward Morgan, 1st Baronet (–1653)
Sir Edward Morgan, 2nd Baronet (died )
Sir Edward Morgan, 3rd Baronet (died 1682)
Sir James Morgan, 4th Baronet (died 1728)

Morgan baronets, of Langattock (1661)
Sir Thomas Morgan, 1st Baronet (–1679)
Sir John Morgan, 2nd Baronet (–1693)
Sir Thomas Morgan, 3rd Baronet (1684–1716)
Sir John Morgan, 4th Baronet (1710–1767)

Gould, later Morgan baronets, of Tredegar (1792)
see Baron Tredegar

Morgan baronets, of Green Street and Lincoln's Inn (1892)
Sir George Osborne Morgan, 1st Baronet (1826–1897)

Morgan baronets, of Whitehall Court (1906)
Sir Walter Vaughan Morgan, 1st Baronet (1831–1916)

See also
Vaughan-Morgan baronets
Hughes-Morgan baronets

References

Extinct baronetcies in the Baronetage of England
Extinct baronetcies in the Baronetage of Great Britain
Extinct baronetcies in the Baronetage of the United Kingdom